Sami Ristilä (born 15 August 1974) is a Finnish football manager and former player.

Player career
Ristilä was born in Valkeakoski. Before he joined Drogheda Ristilä played for MyPa, SC Neukirchen, FC Zwolle and FC Haka. He played an important role in the Drogheda midfield and sometimes played up front. He has represented the Finland national side on two occasions.  He played three seasons with Zwolle in the Dutch Eerste divisie. In December 2008 he returned to FC Haka and signed a contract to 30 December 2011.

He has played 247 games in the Veikkausliiga.

Manager career

The longest spell of his career as a manager was 2013–2016 with Finnish club KTP. After 2015 season KTP got relegated from Veikkausliiga. Poor results continued the next year and Ristilä was replaced by his assistant coach in middle of the season on 30 June 2016.

On 31 August 2016, he joined the coaching staff of Shamrock Rovers under head coach Stephen Bradley, who he formerly played together with at Drogheda United. Sami would work with the development of the Shamrock Rovers Academy on a deal until the end of 2016.

In 2017, he returned to Finland and at the end of the year, he was appointed assistant coach to Toni Korkeakunnas at FC Lahti for the 2018 season with an option for one further year. He was also going to be responsible for the youth development from the U19s to the first team. On 8 October 2018, he was appointed head coach of Lahti, signing a deal until the end of 2020 with an option for one further year. The club announced in October 2019, that Ristilä would leave his position at the end of the year.

Honours
Haka
Veikkausliiga (1): 2004

Drogheda United
FAI Cup (1): 2005
Setanta Sports Cup (2): 2006, 2007
League of Ireland (1): 2007

References

Guardian Football

External links
 https://www.independent.ie/regionals/droghedaindependent/sport/soccer/sami-wants-to-do-the-haka-with-drogheda-27102318.html

1974 births
Living people
People from Valkeakoski
Finnish footballers
Finland youth international footballers
Finnish expatriate footballers
Veikkausliiga players
League of Ireland players
FC Jokerit players
Myllykosken Pallo −47 players
PEC Zwolle players
FC Haka players
Drogheda United F.C. players
Association football midfielders
Finnish football managers
FC Haka managers
FC Lahti managers
Finland under-21 international footballers
Sportspeople from Pirkanmaa